Courtney Birchard (born July 14, 1989) competes for the Canadian national women's ice hockey team. She made her debut for Team Canada in the 2010 Four Nations Cup. She was drafted 6th overall by the Brampton Thunder in the 2011 CWHL Draft. Birchard was born in Etobicoke, Ontario.

Playing career
Birchard was a 2007 graduate of Lincoln M. Alexander High School in Malton, Ontario. While at the school, Birchard lettered in ice hockey, soccer, basketball and badminton. In addition, she competed for the Toronto Jr. Aeros. While with the club, she won provincial titles in 2005 and 2006. The club was also playoff champions in 2004, 2006 and 2007. In 2007, she was the Jr. Aeros captain.

NCAA
Birchard had her first career point with an assist in her collegiate debut. It was on October 5, 2007, against St. Lawrence. Her first collegiate goal was on October 28, 2007, vs. the Maine Black Bears. On October 17, 2009, she reached her 50th career point in a game against Niagara.

During her freshman year of 2007–08 with the New Hampshire Wildcats, she accumulated 28 points (13 in Hockey East play). Birchard ranked second in Hockey East rookie scoring at 0.85 ppg. The Wildcats qualified for the NCAA tournament and Birchard scored a goal in the NCAA quarterfinal win vs. St. Lawrence. On February 16, she established career highs in goals (two) and points (four) vs. the Vermont Catamounts.

The 2008–09 season was her sophomore season and Birchard skated in all 32 regular-season games, while participating in three postseason games. For the season, she had accumulated 23 points (10 in conference play). She notched a goal in the NCAA quarterfinal game vs. Minnesota Duluth. Against Niagara (October 12), she matched her personal best of two goals scored in one game. In nineteen games, she registered at least one point.
 
In her junior season (2009–10), Birchard missed the last six games of the season due to injury. Statistically, Birchard ranked fifth in the NCAA in defensemen scoring (0.81 ppg). Birchard led the Wildcats in shots (136) and tied for the lead in game-winning goals. She accumulated 13 points in conference play. One of the highlights of the season was accumulating a career-high three assists in the Sun Life Frozen Fenway game on January 8 vs. the Northeastern Huskies. Game winning goals were scored against Colgate (October 9), Connecticut (October 31 and February 7), and Northeastern (November 29).

Hockey Canada
Birchard was part of the 2007-08 Hockey Canada Women's Under-22 Team that competed in the MLP Cup. She attended the Canadian Development Camps in numerous years. In 2007, she participated in the U-19 National Development Camp. The following year, she was invited to the U-22 National Development Camp. She was part of the Canadian National Under 22 team that competed in the 2011 MLP Cup. She travelled to Bratislava, Slovakia to participate in the 2011 IIHF High Performance Women's Camp from July 4–12. On April 17, 2012, Birchard along with Meghan Agosta, Gillian Apps, Caroline Ouellette, and head coach Dan Church took part in the opening face off of the playoff game between the Ottawa Senators and the New York Rangers at ScotiaBank Place.

CWHL
Birchard scored a goal for the Brampton Thunder in the championship game of the 2012 Clarkson Cup.

Coaching career
She served as the head coach at Havergal College in Toronto and also served as an assistant for the Oakville Hornets organization. On July 31, 2018, the Toronto Furies signed Kessel as their new head coach. In addition, Ken Dufton was named as an advisor to the team.

Awards and Honours
AWCHA All-America Second Team (2010)
Patty Kazmaier Memorial Award candidate (2010)
Hockey East First Team All-Star (2010)
Hockey East All-Academic Team (2009)
Hockey East All-Tournament Team (2009)
Hockey East Player of the Week (Week of November 9, 2009)
Hockey East Mission Rookie of the Week (Week of March 17, 2008)
2010-11 New England Women's Division I All-Stars
2011 Karyn Bye Award (New Hampshire MVP)

Career stats

NCAA

Personal life
Birchard is married to Blake Kessel, whose siblings include hockey players Phil Kessel and Amanda Kessel.

References

1989 births
Living people
Canadian women's ice hockey forwards
New Hampshire Wildcats women's ice hockey players
Sportspeople from Etobicoke
Ice hockey people from Toronto